Chak Peak is a  mountain summit located in the Athabasca River valley of Jasper National Park, in the Canadian Rockies of Alberta, Canada. Chak is a name derived from the Stoney language meaning "eagle". Precipitation runoff from Chak Peak drains into Portal Creek and Astoria River which are both tributaries of the Athabasca River. 


Climate

Based on the Köppen climate classification, Chak Peak is located in a subarctic climate with cold, snowy winters, and mild summers.

Geology

The mountain is composed of sedimentary rock laid down during the Precambrian to Jurassic periods and pushed east and over the top of younger rock during the Laramide orogeny.

See also
Geography of Alberta

References

Two-thousanders of Alberta
Mountains of Jasper National Park
Alberta's Rockies